The Motorola DROID 3 (GSM/UMTS version:Milestone 3) is a smartphone released on July 7, 2011, by Verizon Wireless running the Android 2.3 operating system by Google. It comes with 16 GB of internal storage. The smartphone does not ship with a microSD card. It has a 4-inch qHD display and an 8-megapixel camera capable of recording 1080p video. Unlike the DROID 2, the Motorola DROID 3 features a 5-row QWERTY keyboard, with a dedicated number row. It also has a VGA front-facing camera for video calls.  The Droid 3 ships with Android 2.3.4 (Gingerbread) with Motorola's updated proprietary Motoblur UI.  Like other contemporary Motorola phones, it has a locked bootloader.

Software updates 
The DROID 3 received its first OTA system-wide software update on September 30, 2011. A new update, version 5.7.894, leaked on November 6, 2011 and was made available for download. It has not been released as an OTA update. Other versions have leaked, but some were pulled after some phones were rendered unusable after installation. The version listed above is not one that rendered phones useless.

Through January and February, 3 more OTA updates leaked. Versions 5.7.902, 5.7.905 and 5.7.906 were released through January and February 2012. On March 7, 2012, Motorola sent out emails to Motorola Feedback Network members to test a new software update.  It has started rolling out as of March 9.

The DROID 3 will not get an update to Android 4.0 (Ice Cream Sandwich).

Features
The smartphone includes regular 3G network, Wi-Fi, HDMI output, 1 GHz OMAP dual-core processor, 512 MB of RAM, a 4.0-inch qHD (960 x 540) display, 3G mobile hotspot capability, an 8-megapixel camera with 1080p HD video capture, and a VGA front-facing camera. The phone comes with Adobe Flash, as well as an HDMI output to an HDTV. The DROID 3 is a global phone, and is distributed by Verizon Wireless in the United States. Motorola DROID 3 was the second dual-core Android handset on Verizon.

See also 
 Motorola Droid released November 6, 2009.
 Motorola Droid Pro optimized for business users, released November 18, 2010.
 Motorola Droid X Android 2.3 version hardware released in Mexico.
 Motorola Droid 2 released August 12, 2010.
 Motorola Droid X2 released May 19, 2011.
 Motorola Droid 4 released February 10, 2012.
 List of Android devices
 Galaxy Nexus

References

External links 
 
 Motorola Droid 3 Review
 ZDnet - Motorola Droid 3 specs revealed in leaked Verizon document

Motorola Droid 3
Android (operating system) devices
Droid 3
Mobile phones introduced in 2011
Discontinued smartphones
Verizon Wireless
Slider phones
Mobile phones with user-replaceable battery